The Lion Throne is the English term used to identify the throne of the Dalai Lama of Tibet. It specifically refers to the throne historically used by Dalai Lamas at Potala Palace in Lhasa.

See also 
 List of Dalai Lamas
 Tibetan independence movement
 National emblem
 Dragon Throne of the Emperors of China
 Throne of England and the Kings of England
 Chrysanthemum Throne of the Emperors of Japan
 Phoenix Throne of the Kings of Korea
 Peacock Throne of the Mughal Empire 
 Sun Throne of the Persian Empire
 Naderi Throne in Iran

References 

Thrones
Dalai Lamas